Sridevi Movies(Telugu: శ్రీదేవి మూవీస్) is an Indian film production and distribution company established in 1987 by Sivalenka Krishna Prasad, nephew of veteran Telugu film actor Chandra Mohan (Telugu actor). The company is based in Hyderabad and has produced films in Telugu and Tamil languages. The production house is known for projects like Aditya 369 which was one of India's first science-fiction movie starring Nandamuri Balakrishna released in the year 1991 under the direction of filmmaker Singeetam Srinivasa Rao.

Film production
The production house's latest released film was Sammohanam with Sudheer Babu as the lead actor and Aditi Rao Hydari in the female Lead role under the direction of Mohana Krishna Indraganti.

Sridevi Movies is known for its blockbusters, its beginning marked by the filming of the movie Chinnodu Peddodu in 1988. The company delivered several successful projects, including Aditya 369, Vamsanikokkadu starring Nandamuri BalaKrishna, and Ooyala starring Srikanth & Ramya Krishnan. This production house latest Release film was Gentleman with Nani as lead hero and Surbhi as the opposite lead under the direction of Mohan Krishna Indraganti.

Production

Dubbed Films

As an Associate Production

References

External links
 
 

Film production companies based in Hyderabad, India
Mass media companies established in 1987
Film distributors of India
1987 establishments in Andhra Pradesh